Dimaina is a small village with 435 residents in Argolis, Greece. With Nea Epidavros, Palaia Epidavros, Tracheia and Koliaki it is part of the Epidaurus municipality.

Near Dimaina there is  famous monastery of Taxiarchon built in 15th century. The founder of the monastery was the Patriarch Niphon of Constantinople.

Historical population

References

Populated places in Argolis